Shakuntala Nayar (born January 1926) was an Indian politician who was a member of Lok Sabha. She was elected to Lok Sabha from Kaiserganj (Lok Sabha constituency) in Uttar Pradesh as a candidate of Jana Sangha. She was born in 1926 in Dehradun and studied at Wynberg Girls High School Mussorie. She was married with K.K. Nayar a civil servant in 1946. She was a member of Uttar Pradesh Legislative Assembly from 1962 to 1967. She was elected to Lok Sabha thrice, in 1952 as member of Hindu Maha Sabha, and in 1967 and 1971 from Kaiserganj as member of Bharatiya Jana Sangh.

References

1926 births
Possibly living people
20th-century Indian politicians
20th-century Indian women politicians
Bharatiya Jana Sangh politicians
Lok Sabha members from Uttar Pradesh
Women in Uttar Pradesh politics
India MPs 1952–1957
India MPs 1967–1970
India MPs 1971–1977
Uttar Pradesh MLAs 1962–1967
People from Bahraich district